Ronan Wantenaar (born 10 February 2001) is a Namibian swimmer. He competed in the men's 50 metre breaststroke event at the 2017 World Aquatics Championships. In 2019, he represented Namibia at the 2019 World Aquatics Championships held in Gwangju, South Korea.

References

2001 births
Living people
Namibian male swimmers
Place of birth missing (living people)
Male breaststroke swimmers
Swimmers at the 2022 Commonwealth Games
Commonwealth Games competitors for Namibia